HD 199442 is a giant star situated in the Aquarius constellation. It is located about 310 light years from the Solar System.

References

External links
 Image HD 199442

Aquarius (constellation)
199442
103414
K-type giants
8017
Durchmusterung objects